Remco Industries, Inc. was a toy company in the United States founded in the 1940s. It was best known for toys marketed and sold in the late 1950s and early 1960s, like the 'Johnny Reb Cannon', 'Mighty Matilda Atomic Aircraft Carrier', 'Remco Voice Control Kennedy Airport' (which featured model airplanes of American, TWA and United Airlines, a record player and an album which played a voice giving landing and take-off instructions) and the tethered 'Electronic Falcon Plane' that "flies itself". The company's slogan was "Every Boy Wants a Remco Toy...And So Do Girls!"

History
Remco was founded by two cousins, Isaac "Ike" Heller and Saul Robbins. Armand Daddis soon joined the two as the company gradually moved from simple 'walkie-talkies' to a variety of sophisticated remote control toys. The name Remco comes from the two words "Remote Control". Originally located in Newark, NJ, the company later moved to nearby Harrison, New Jersey.

The boxes and toys were printed with just the company name and the city on them, but there  were a few more clues as to the company's physical location on packaging. A street address listed on the back of the 1960 light bulldog tank box is "113 North 13th Street, Newark 7, NJ." The address on the instruction sheet for factory service return of the 1966 Lost in Space Robot is "Cape May St., Harrison, NJ." The Harrison location is now occupied by the Red Bull Arena, while the Newark location is now occupied by a furniture outlet.

In the mid-1960s, Remco acquired several licenses for popular culture groups and TV shows and proceeded to make a variety of toys. Some of these were the Beatles, the Monkees, Lost In Space, The Munsters, Batman and Star Trek. However, the company often paid little heed to faithfulness to the property.  For example, the  merchandise Remco released for Star Trek was usually generic toys from previous unrelated lines and had decals of the series simply placed on them, which is a technique called "label slapping." One popular toy in the early 1960s was the 24 inch long functioning scuba diver with mask, knife, utility belt, rifle, walkie-talkie, air tanks, and floating location buoy.

From the 1980s through the 1990s, Remco made a variety of generic diecast and plastic trucks and other vehicles, usually made about four inches long. Vehicles were attractive and sturdy, though not uniform in scale, and included a tanker truck, fire truck, delivery van, cherry picker truck, skid steer, Jeep, and many more. A few vehicles were larger, like the seven inch long "Tuff Ones" "Recyclable Waste Management Corp." truck with opening side doors for "cans", "glass", and "paper".

Bankruptcy
Remco filed for bankruptcy in 1971 and was acquired by Azrak-Hamway International, Inc. (AHI), a toy company, in New York City in 1974.

The company was known by toy collectors for their many Universal Monsters figures produced during the 1980s. These figures were a continuation of the license and figures first produced by AHI during the 1970s. In 1997, Jakks Pacific acquired Remco from Azrak-Hamway.

Toys

1950s

1950s Space Commander Walkie Talkies 
1953 Medicine Chest
1955 Big Max (magnetic robot that picked off iron slugs from battery operated conveyor belt and placed them into slots)
1957 Firebird 99 battery powered dashboard game.
1957 Pom Pom Gun, battery powered double-barrel cannon.
1958 Giant Wheel Cowboys'n Indians Game
1958 Giant Wheel Thrills'n Spills Horse Race Game
1959 Coney Island Penny Machine (Combination crane game and coin bank) 
1959 Flying Fox Airliner
1959 Little Red Spinning Wheel
1959 Movieland Drive-In Theater (consisted of cars, a drive in board with car spaces, a place to list "Featured Movies" along with blue and white double-bill cards that slid into the marquee; the "movie" was a film strip that projected by a battery operated light bulb onto a 4"x6" screen that attached to the drive in.   Titles included Heckle and Jeckle, Have Gun Will Travel, Mighty Mouse, Farmer Al Falfa)
1959 Yankee Doodle Secret Rocket Test Center

1960s
1960 Frogman the US Navy Commando
1960 Light Bulldog Tank #706 Montgomary Ward
1960 Whirlybird Helicopter
1961 Hippopotamus Electric Puzzle Game called Happy Hippopotamus Game
1961 Johnny Reb Cannon
1961 Mighty Matilda Aircraft Carrier
1961 Shark Remote Control Race Car
1961 Baby Laugh-A-Lot
1962 Fascination Pool Game
1962 Arthur Showboat Theater Playset
1962 Littlechap Dolls
1962 Caravelle Radio Transmitter and Receiver
1963 Barracuda Submarine
1963 USMC Bazooka
1963 Super Car
1964 Mr.Kelly's Car Wash
1964 Beatles Figures
1964 Hamilton Invaders
1964 Project Yankee Doodle
1964 Monkey Division
1964 Lyndon B. Johnson Doll
1964 Senator Barry Goldwater Doll
1964 Blippo Building Blocks
1964 Munsters
1965 Bulldog Army Tank
1965 Duffy's Daredevils
1965 Kennedy Airport Air Traffic Control Center
1966 Batman Wrist Radios
1965 Screaming Mee Mee-e Rifle
1966 Lost in Space Robot
1966 Pussy Meow Doll
1967 Mighty Mike Motorized Trucks
1967 Polo Pony
1967 Voyage to the Bottom of the Sea Sub sets
1967 Star Trek Astro Cruiser
1968 Land of the Giants Space Sled
1968 Astro Train
1968 Boeing United Airlines 727 Toy Airplane (4.7 ft long)
1969 Baby Sister Grow-A-Tooth
1969 Pan Am Dual Control Jet Cockpit
1969 Kitty Karry-All (The Brady Bunch)
1969 Tru-Smoke Trucks
1969 Tumbling Tom Boy Doll
1969 Frustration Ball

1970s
1970 Speedrail Monorail
1970 Dune Buggy Wheelies
1970 Jumpsy Doll
1970 Mister Brain
1970 Monkees Figures
1971 Mighty Casey Backyard Railroad
1971 Finger Ding Paper Dolls
1971 Baby Laugh a Lot
1973 Partridge Family Doll
1975 Magic Magic Magic Board Game
1975 Star Trek Utility Belt
1976 I Dream of Jeannie Bottle
1976 McDonaldland Playset and figures
1977 System 7 Rifle
1978 Energized Spider-Man
1978 Kiss Makeup Kit
1978 Mickey Mouse Candy Factory
1978 Bill Cosby's Kids
1979 the Incredible Hulk Instant Muscles

1980s
1980 Universal Monsters Figures
1981 Dukes of Hazzard
1982 Sgt. Rock for DC
1982 Warlord for DC
1983 Crystar for Marvel Comics
1984 Conan Action Figures
1984 Mighty Crusaders Action Figures
1984 Zybots
1985 AWA Remco Action Figures Wrestling Figures
1985 Firffels The "Original" Two-feature Creature
1986 Karate Kid Action Figures 
1987 My Sweet 16 Play Cosmetics

1990s
1991 Wilbur the Water Pup
1992 Steel Tec Motorized Construction Set 
1992 Terminator 2: Judgment Day Rock 'Em Sock 'Em Robots
1994 Swat Kats action figures

References

External links
 1969 Remco Toy Catalog
 1979 Remco Toy Catalog
 Another Remco list of toys and small article

Toy companies of the United States
Defunct toy manufacturers
Toy soldier manufacturing companies
Defunct companies based in New Jersey